Jimmy Ryan (1 March 1879 – 28 December 1954) was  an Australian rules footballer who played with Collingwood in the Victorian Football League (VFL).

Notes

External links 

		
Jimmy Ryan's profile at Collingwood Forever

1879 births
1954 deaths
Australian rules footballers from Victoria (Australia)
Collingwood Football Club players